Provincial electoral divisions (also known as constituencies or ridings) in Manitoba are currently single-member ridings that each elect one member to the Legislative Assembly of Manitoba. The individual who is elected thereby becomes a Member of the Legislative Assembly (MLA).

Electoral boundaries are reviewed every 10 years by the Manitoba Electoral Divisions Boundaries Commission. The current provincial electoral boundaries were established in December 2018 and went into effect for the 42nd general election, held on September 10, 2019.

Manitoba today has 57 electoral divisions.

Electoral Divisions Boundaries Commission 
Manitoba's provincial electoral boundaries are reviewed every 10 years by the Manitoba Electoral Divisions Boundaries Commission.

The Commission was established on March 31, 1955, with The Electoral Divisions Act, which sets out the composition of the Commission. There were three original Commission members: Manitoba’s Chief Justice, the President of the University of Manitoba, and the Chief Electoral Officer of Manitoba.

The 2018 Commission was made up of five members:

 Richard J. F. Chartier – Chief Justice of Manitoba 
 David Barnard – University of Manitoba President and Vice-Chancellor
 Steven Robinson – Brandon University interim President and Vice-Chancellor
 Harvey Briggs – University College of the North Dean, Faculty of Arts, Business and Science
 Shipra Verma – Chief Electoral Officer of Manitoba

2018 divisions

Northern Manitoba 
The 2018 provincial electoral districts in Northern Manitoba:

 Flin Flon
 Keewatinook
 The Pas-Kameesak
 Thompson

South Eastern Manitoba 
The 2018 provincial electoral districts in the southeastern Manitoba:

 Borderland
 Dawson Trail
 Interlake-Gimli
 La Verendrye
 Lac du Bonnet
 Lakeside
 Midland
 Morden-Winkler
 Red River North
 Selkirk
 Springfield-Ritchot
 Steinbach

South Western Manitoba 
The 2018 provincial electoral districts in the southwestern Manitoba:

 Agassiz
 Brandon East
 Brandon West
 Dauphin
 Portage la Prairie
 Riding Mountain
 Spruce Woods
 Swan River
 Turtle Mountain

Winnipeg 
The 2018 provincial electoral districts in Winnipeg:

 Assiniboia
 Burrows
 Concordia
 Elmwood
 Fort Garry
 Fort Richmond
 Fort Rouge
 Fort Whyte
 Kildonan-River East
 Kirkfield Park
 Lagimodière
 Maples, The
 McPhillips
 Notre Dame
 Point Douglas
 Radisson
 Riel
 River Heights
 Roblin
 Rossmere
 Seine River
 Southdale
 St. Boniface
 St. James
 St. Johns
 St. Vital
 Transcona
 Tuxedo
 Tyndall Park
 Union Station
 Waverley
 Wolseley

Former districts 

 Arthur
 Arthur-Virden
 Birtle
 Birtle-Russell
 Brandon City
 Broadway
 Carillon
 Carman
 Cartier
 Charleswood
 Churchill
 Crescentwood
 Cypress
 Deloraine—Glenwood
 Dufferin
 Ellice
 Emerson
 Ethelbert
 Fairford
 Fisher
 Fort Garry-Riverview
 Gilbert Plains
 Gimli
 Gladstone
 Hamiota
 Iberville
 Inkster
 Interlake
 Kildonan
 Kildonan—Transcona
 Killarney
 Lansdowne
 Logan
 Lord Roberts
 Manitou–Morden
 Minnedosa
 Minto
 Morden
 Morden and Rhineland
 Morris
 Mountain
 Niakwa
 Norfolk—Beautiful Plains
 Osborne
 The Pas
 Pembina
 Rhineland
 River East
 Roblin-Russell
 Rock Lake
 Rockwood
 Rosenfeld
 Russell
 Seven Oaks
 Springfield
 St. Andrews
 St. Clements
 St. George
 St. Norbert
 St. Paul
 Ste. Rose
 Sturgeon Creek
 Virden
 Wellington
 Winnipeg
 Winnipeg Centre
 Winnipeg North
 Winnipeg South
 Winnipeg West

See also 
 Canadian provincial electoral districts
List of Manitoba general elections
List of Manitoba by-elections
Elections Manitoba
List of Canadian federal electoral districts in Manitoba

References

External links 

 Legislature of Manitoba

Manitoba provincial electoral districts
Manitoba
Electoral districts